Mycole is a given name. Notable people with the given name include:

MyCole Pruitt (born 1992), American football player